Dan Franck (born 17 October 1952 in Paris) is a French novelist and screenwriter.

His novel La Séparation won the 1991 Prix Renaudot, and was made into a movie, La Séparation.

Works
Apolline, Seuil, 1997, 
Bohèmes Calmann-Lévy, 2000, 

Boro s'en va t'en guerre (avec Jean Vautrin) Fayard, 2000, 
La dame de Berlin, (avec Jean Vautrin), France Loisirs, 1987, 
La Dama de Berlín: las aventuras de Boro, reportero gráfico, Translator María José Furió, Planeta, 1992, 
La Dame du soir, Seuil, 1995, 
La Séparation, Éd. Corps 16, 1991, 
Separation, A.A. Knopf, 1994, ; Vintage, 1995, 
Le Cimetière des fous, Flammarion, 1989, 
Le Petit Livre de l'Orchestre et de ses instruments, Mazarine, 1981, 
Le Petit Livre des instruments de musique, Éd. du Seuil, 1993, 
Le Temps des Cerises (avec Jean Vautrin) Casterman, 2011, 
Les Adieux, Flammarion, 1987, 
Les calendes grecques: roman, Seuil, 2000, Prix du premier roman
Les Enfants, Librairie générale française, 2005, 
Les Noces de Guernica (avec Jean Vautrin), Pocket, 2004, 
Libertad!,  Grasset, 2004, 
Libertad! L'amore e l'impegno, l'arte e la politica, i drammi e la leggerezza nella Parigi degli anni Trenta, Translator A. Tadini Perazzoli, Garzanti Libri, 2007, 
Mademoiselle Chat: Les aventures de Boro, reporter photographe(avec Jean Vautrin) Pocket, 2007, 
Nu couché, Seuil, 1998, 
Picasso, Le carnet de la Californie: Dessins Cercle d'art, 1999, 
Tabac: récit, Seuil, 1995, 
Un siècle d'amour (avec Enki Bilal) Casterman, 2009, 
Une jeune fille, 
Zidane : Le roman d'une victoire (avec Zinedine Zidane)
Cher Boro (avec Jean Vautrin) Fayard, 2005, 
La fëte à Boro (avec Jean Vautrin), éd. Grasset & Fasquelle, 2007)
Roman nègre, éd. Grasset & Fasquelle, 2008, 
La Dame de Jérusalem (avec Jean Vautrin), éd. Grasset & Fasquelle, 2009, 
Minuit, éd. Grasset & Fasquelle, 2010, 
My Russian Love, Translator Jon Rothschild, Doubleday Publishing, 1997,

Screenplays

 Résistance (2014)
 Marseille'' TV series (2016)

Reviews

References

20th-century French non-fiction writers
Prix du premier roman winners
Living people
French male novelists
Ghostwriters
Writers from Paris
1952 births
20th-century French male writers
French male non-fiction writers
Prix Renaudot winners